Mirodenafil belongs to the drug class PDE5 inhibitors, which includes avanafil, sildenafil, tadalafil, udenafil, and vardenafil, and is the first-line treatment for erectile dysfunction.  Developed by SK Chemicals Life Science, mirodenafil is marketed in Korea under the trade name Mvix, offered both as tablets (50 mg and 100 mg) and as orally dissolving film (50 mg).

Several clinical trials were conducted, but mirodenafil has not been approved for use in the United States by the U.S. Food and Drug Administration.

References

PDE5 inhibitors